Alive!! is the first full-length album by American singer-songwriter Becca, released in 2008.

Track listing
All tracks produced by Meredith Brooks.

Personnel
Becca – vocals
Rob Daiker – bass, guitar, keyboards, backing vocals, Programming
Joe Mengis- Drums
Akira – Guitars
Dave Darling – Guitars, Bass, Keyboards, Programming
Yutaro – Bass
Roger Carter – Drums
Kenji Oshima – Drums
Doarian Crozier – Drums
Bob Lynn – Drums
Christopher Camp – Bass (Live)
Michael Lee – Piano, Hammond B3

Production
Producer: Meredith Brooks
Executive Producers: Michihiko Nakayama, Sach Tsuchiya, Kazuhisa Saito
Engineers: Rob Daiker, Dave Darling, Mark Needham, Chris Steffen
Mixing: Mark Needham, Chris Satriani
Mastering: Leon Zervos (Sterling Sound)
Programming: Rob Daiker, Dave Darling
Design: Takuya Nakashiro (BUCCI)
Art Direction: Takuya Nakashiro (BUCCI)
Photography: Makoto Okuguchi

References 

2008 albums